The 2012 CIS Women's Volleyball Championship was held March 2, 2012 to March 4, 2012, in Hamilton, Ontario, to determine a national champion for the 2011–12 CIS women's volleyball season. The tournament was played at the Burridge Gymnasium at McMaster University. It was the second time that McMaster had hosted the tournament with the first time occurring in 1979.

The second-seeded UBC Thunderbirds won their fifth consecutive national championship in their five-set win over the top-seeded Alberta Pandas. The gold medal game was a rematch of the Canada West finals that had also gone to five sets, but eventually was won by the Pandas.

Participating teams

Championship bracket

Consolation bracket

Awards

Championship awards 
CIS Tournament MVP – Lisa Barclay, UBC
R.W. Pugh Fair Play Award – Briana Liau Kent, UBC

All-Star Team 
Lisa Barclay, UBC
Shanice Marcelle, UBC
Brina Derksen-Bergen, UBC
Alena Omelchenko, Alberta
Jaki Ellis, Alberta
Geneviève Plante, McGill
Marie-Sophie Nadeau, Montreal

References

External links 
 Tournament Web Site

U Sports volleyball
2012 in women's volleyball
McMaster University